Jessica Hammond is a New Zealand public servant, politician, playwright, and blogger. Hammond stood for The Opportunities Party for Ōhāriu in the 2017 and 2020 general elections.

Political history

2017 general election

In August 2017, Hammond announced that she would contest the Ōhāriu electorate during the 2017 New Zealand general election.

She came third, with 2898 votes, 7.29% of 40,026 valid votes. Hammond's campaign emerged as one of the strongest of the 26 The Opportunities Party (TOP) candidates, beating the candidates from the Green Party, New Zealand First, United Future, and ACT New Zealand in Ōhāriu.

Following the election, Hammond stood in the 2018 Opportunities Party leadership election and came third at 13.25 percent (137 votes).

2020 general election

Geoff Simmons took leadership of TOP and planned on rebuilding the party. Hammond returned to TOP.

In January 2020, Hammond announced that she would contest the Ōhāriu electorate for TOP during the 2020 New Zealand general election.

Hammond and Geoff Simmons announced a policy promising to reserve approximately $2.5b every year from central government's GST tax take for councils to spend on infrastructure. They launched their policy in front of the Mt Victoria Tunnel which is a road link between Wellington's CBD and the airport that both National and Labour have promised to expand.

Hammond contested Equality Network's Scorecard of each party's commitment to addressing inequality, which raised TOP's score from one star to one and a half, bringing it in line with Labour and Māori Party in second equal place.

Hammond said the housing crisis in New Zealand was a "slow-moving crisis" ignored by both parties, because they didn't have the "guts" to fix it.

She campaigned on redeveloping the Johnsonville Mall, which leaks when it rains.

In September 2020, Hammond spoke at the Renters United protest on the Parliament lawn, also attended by Green Party's co-leader James Shaw. They protested the end to the Government's rent freeze, implemented in March under urgent coronavirus legislation, which allowed landlords to resume giving rent increase notices. Hammond called for a mandatory warrant of fitness for rental properties and a greater focus on medium-density housing.

She came third, with 4,443 votes, 10.18% of 43,646 valid votes. Hammond beat the candidates in Ōhāriu from the Green Party, New Zealand First, ACT New Zealand, New Conservatives, ONE Party, and Advance New Zealand.

After the 2020 election
In December 2020, Hammond spoke at a protest outside Parliament designed to remind MPs of a recent survey by The Salvation Army where one in five Kiwis said they can't afford to celebrate Christmas. The demonstration has been organised by the United Community Action Network (UCAN) after more than 40 welfare and poverty charities signed an open letter to the Government pleading for them to increase welfare in the lead up to Christmas.

Personal life
Hammond was born in Wellington, New Zealand. Hammond has qualifications in economics, psychology, and philosophy. Hammond graduated with a Masters in Philosophy from Victoria University of Wellington and has 2 children. Hammond is a Khandallah homeowner. She works as a public servant.

Hammond's daughters both have allergies and Hammond has written about the precautions taken as a parent to prevent reactions.

In 2016, Hammond wrote the play Kiwiman and Robin, which was performed at Gryphon Theatre. Inspired by The Marvelous Mrs. Maisel, Hammond performed at an open mic stand-up comedy night in 2019.

Electoral history

2017 Ōhāriu general election

2020 Ōhāriu general election

2018 Opportunities Party leadership election

Notes

References

External links 
 Jessica Hammond candidate profile
 
 
 

21st-century New Zealand politicians
Victoria University of Wellington alumni
The Opportunities Party politicians
Unsuccessful candidates in the 2017 New Zealand general election
Unsuccessful candidates in the 2020 New Zealand general election
Living people
Year of birth missing (living people)
New Zealand public servants
21st-century New Zealand public servants
People from Wellington City
21st-century New Zealand dramatists and playwrights
New Zealand dramatists and playwrights
New Zealand women dramatists and playwrights
New Zealand bloggers
New Zealand women bloggers